The Ford Falcon (XF) is a full-sized car that was produced by Ford Australia from 1984 to 1988. It was the third and final iteration of the fourth generation of the Falcon and also included the Ford Fairmont (XF)—the luxury-oriented version. Between 1993 and 1999, this series provided the platform for the Falcon utility (XG and XH) that was sold alongside the fifth-generation Ford Falcon sedans and wagons.

Overview
The XF sedan and wagon range was sold between October 1984 and February 1988, with the utility and panel vans running through to March 1993.

The ride and handling were described as competent, but the unpowered steering was heavy at low speeds with an overly strong castor action after performing a manoeuvre such as a U-turn. Power steering was an option on higher-specification models, which in contrast was described by some as too light. Engines were modified to run on unleaded fuel from January 1986. The XF series remains Ford's best-selling Falcon model ever built by Ford Australia, with 278,101 built, helped by a prolonged run of the utility and panel van models.

Powertrains 
XF models were available with a choice of 3.3 or 4.1-litre engine six-cylinder engines. The 4.1-litre unit was standard on Fairmont models and the S-Pack.

Transmissions available were 3 speed column shift, four- or five-speed manual floor shift, or the much more popular three-speed automatic with the selector lever located either on the floor or the column in cars that seat six. In three-seat utilities and vans, the three-speed manual on the column was standard.

Specification levels 
 Falcon (utility and panel van)
 Falcon GL (utility, panel van, sedan, and wagon)
 Falcon GLS Ute (utility) 
 Fairmont (sedan and wagon)
 Fairmont Ghia (sedan and wagon): the luxury Ghia featured a 4.1-litre fuel-injected or carburettor inline six-cylinder engine, and a trip computer that calculated fuel consumption and driving times, among other things. The drive line consisted of a BW40 three-speed auto with either a 2.77 or 2.92 LSD and four-wheel disc brakes. A wagon variant of the Ghia was made available from October 1986.

An optional "S" pack was available on some models, featuring body stripes, fog lamps, styled wheels, Falcon "S" badging, steering rack adjustment, driver's lumbar support, driver's seat tilt and footrest, and sports instrument cluster.

Ford produced some limited-edition, value-packaged vehicles during the XF series, including the Falcon Silver Edition sedan of 1985 to commemorate the 25th anniversary of the Ford Falcon in Australia. Also, a six-seater GL-based Falcon Family Edition sedan and wagon were offered in 1986. These limited-edition vehicles featured unique versions of two-tone "style-tone" paintwork.

Nissan Ute 

The Nissan Ute was a badge-engineered version of the XF Falcon utility sold by Nissan in Australia from July 1988 to September 1992. Nissan Utes were sold as a result of a model-sharing scheme known as the Button car plan. In an attempt to rationalise the Australian automotive industry, the Button plan induced car manufacturers to share core platforms. For this particular vehicle, XF series Ford utility vehicles were rebadged as "Nissan".

Nissan did not offer the various equipment levels of the Ford donor vehicle, instead offering only two basic trims (DX and ST) without the option of an "S" pack. The plan was generally considered a "disaster" by the industry, as the car buying public steered clear of the badge-engineered vehicles. Furthermore, spare parts could often be purchased from only the original vehicle maker—as was the case with the Nissan Ute. The model code was "XFN".

Motorsport
Due to the lack of a V8 engine, the XF Falcon was not suitable for involvement in the Australian Touring Car Championship, with most Ford supporting drivers and/or teams electing to race the Ford Mustang or Ford Sierra RS Cosworth under the new Group A regulations.

The XF Falcon, however, was raced in the AUSCAR series, with Jim Richards winning the first AUSCAR series in a XF Falcon. XF AUSCAR's were fitted with 5.8 L 351 Cleveland V8s (subsequent Falcon models in AUSCAR racing would use the 5.0 L 302 cid V8), and had an aero kit designed by Ford Australia designer Wayne Draper.

References

Further reading
 

XF
Cars of Australia
Cars introduced in 1984
XF Falcon
Sedans
Station wagons
Coupé utilities
Vans
Rear-wheel-drive vehicles
1980s cars
1990s cars
Cars discontinued in 1993